Habib Dlimi (born 21 May 1950) is a Tunisian wrestler. He competed in the men's Greco-Roman 48 kg at the 1972 Summer Olympics.

References

1950 births
Living people
Tunisian male sport wrestlers
Olympic wrestlers of Tunisia
Wrestlers at the 1972 Summer Olympics
Place of birth missing (living people)